This is a list of 164 species in Hemerobius, a genus of brown lacewings in the family Hemerobiidae.

Hemerobius species

 Hemerobius abditus Tjeder, 1961 c g
 Hemerobius adelgivorus Kimmins, 1961 c g
 Hemerobius albipennis Banks, 1910 i c g
 Hemerobius alpestris Banks, 1908 i c g
 Hemerobius angustipennis C.-k. Yang, 1992 c g
 Hemerobius anomalus (Monserrat, 1992) c g
 Hemerobius antigonus Banks, 1941 i c g
 Hemerobius apatridus Monserrat, 2001 c g
 Hemerobius aper Tjeder, 1961 c g
 Hemerobius aphidioides Schrank, 1781 c g
 Hemerobius aphidivorus Schrank, 1781 c g
 Hemerobius atriangulus C.-k. Yang, 1987 c g
 Hemerobius atrifrons McLachlan, 1868 c g
 Hemerobius atrocorpus C.-k. Yang, 1997 c g
 Hemerobius australis Walker, 1853 c g
 Hemerobius azoricus Tjeder, 1948 c g
 Hemerobius baguiensis Navás, 1923 c g
 Hemerobius barkalovi Dubatolov, 1997 c g
 Hemerobius betulinus Strøm, 1788 c g
 Hemerobius binigripunctatus Fraser, 1957 c g
 Hemerobius bispinus Banks, 1940 c g
 Hemerobius bistrigatus Currie, 1904 i c g b
 Hemerobius bolivari Banks, 1910 i c g
 Hemerobius canadai Navás, 1925 c g
 Hemerobius centralis Navás, 1913 i c g
 Hemerobius ceraticus Navás, 1924 c g
 Hemerobius cercodes Navás, 1917 c g
 Hemerobius chiangi Banks, 1940 c g
 Hemerobius chilensis Nakahara, 1965 i c g
 Hemerobius claggi Banks, 1937 c g
 Hemerobius coccophagus Göszy, 1852 c g
 Hemerobius colombianus Krueger, 1922 i c g
 Hemerobius comorensis Krüger, 1922 c g
 Hemerobius conjunctus Fitch, 1855 i c g
 Hemerobius contumax Tjeder, 1932 c g
 Hemerobius convexus Monserrat, 2004 c g
 Hemerobius corticus Schrank, 1802 c g
 Hemerobius costalis Carpenter, 1940 i c g
 Hemerobius cubanus Banks, 1930 i c g
 Hemerobius darlingtoni Banks, 1938 i c g
 Hemerobius daxueshanus C.-k. Yang, 1992 c g
 Hemerobius deceptor Navás, 1914 c g
 Hemerobius discretus Navás, 1917 i c g
 Hemerobius disparilis Navás, 1936 c g
 Hemerobius domingensis Banks, 1941 i c g
 Hemerobius dorsatus Banks, 1904 i c g
 Hemerobius eatoni Morton, 1906 c g
 Hemerobius edui Monserrat, 1991 c g
 Hemerobius elatus Navás, 1914 c g
 Hemerobius elongatus Monserrat, 1990 c g
 Hemerobius exceptatus Nakahara, 1965 i c g
 Hemerobius exoterus Navás, 1936 c g
 Hemerobius falciger (Tjeder, 1963) c g
 Hemerobius fenestratus Tjeder, 1932 c g
 Hemerobius flaveolus (Banks, 1940) c g
 Hemerobius flavus Gmelin, 1790 c
 Hemerobius fossilis Weyenbergh, 1869 c g
 Hemerobius frontalis Hagen, 1858 c g
 Hemerobius fujimotoi Nakahara, 1960 c g
 Hemerobius gaitoi Monserrat, 1996 c g
 Hemerobius gilvus Stein, 1863 c g
 Hemerobius grahami Banks, 1940 c g
 Hemerobius greeni Banks, 1913 c g
 Hemerobius griseus Fabricius, 1777 c g
 Hemerobius hagenii Parfitt, 1860 c g
 Hemerobius handschini Tjeder, 1957 c g
 Hemerobius harmandinus Navás, 1910 c g
 Hemerobius hedini Tjeder, 1936 c g
 Hemerobius hengduanus C.-k. Yang, 1981 c g
 Hemerobius hernandezi Monserrat, 1996 c g
 Hemerobius hespericus Navás, 1931 c g
 Hemerobius higginsii Brodie, 1845 c g
 Hemerobius hirsuticornis Monserrat & Deretsky, 1999 c g
 Hemerobius humulinus Linnaeus, 1758 i c g b
 Hemerobius hyalinus Nakahara, 1966 c g
 Hemerobius iamaicensis Panzer, 1785 c g
 Hemerobius immaculatus Olivier, 1793 c g
 Hemerobius incertus Makarkin, 1991 c g
 Hemerobius incursus Banks, 1931 c g
 Hemerobius indicus Kimmins, 1938 c g
 Hemerobius inversus Navás, 1927 c g
 Hemerobius jamaicensis Banks, 1938 i c g
 Hemerobius japonicus Nakahara, 1915 c g
 Hemerobius javanus Krüger, 1922 c g
 Hemerobius jucundus Navás, 1928 i c g
 Hemerobius kobayashii Nakahara, 1956 c g
 Hemerobius kokaneeanus Currie, 1904 i c g
 Hemerobius kutsimensis New, 1989 c g
 Hemerobius lautus Navás, 1909 c g
 Hemerobius lii C.-k. Yang, 1981 c g
 Hemerobius longialatus C.-k. Yang, 1987 c g
 Hemerobius lutescens Fabricius, 1793 c g
 Hemerobius madeirae Tjeder, 1940 c g
 Hemerobius marginatus Stephens, 1836 c g
 Hemerobius martinezae Monserrat, 1996 c g
 Hemerobius maxillosus Lichtenstein, 1796 c g
 Hemerobius melanostictos Gmelin, 1790 c g
 Hemerobius micans Olivier, 1793 c g
 Hemerobius montsae Monserrat, 1996 c g
 Hemerobius morobensis New, 1989 c g
 Hemerobius nairobicus Navás, 1910 c g
 Hemerobius namjagbarwanus C.-k. Yang et al. in Huang et al., 1988 c g
 Hemerobius natalensis Tjeder, 1961 c g
 Hemerobius nekoi Monserrat, 1996 c g
 Hemerobius nemoralis Müller, 1764 c g
 Hemerobius nemorensis Kimmins, 1952 c g
 Hemerobius niger Uddman, 1790 c
 Hemerobius nigrans Carpenter, 1940 i c g
 Hemerobius nigricornis Nakahara, 1915 c g
 Hemerobius nigridorsus Monserrat, 1996 c g
 Hemerobius nigrostigma Monserrat, 1990 c g
 Hemerobius nitidulus Fabricius, 1777 c g
 Hemerobius obscurus Müller, 1764 c g
 Hemerobius ovalis Carpenter, 1940 i c g
 Hemerobius pacificus Banks, 1897 i c g
 Hemerobius pallidus Uddman, 1790 c g
 Hemerobius pallipes Olivier, 1793 c g
 Hemerobius parvulus (Rambur, 1842) c g
 Hemerobius pehlkeanus (Krüger, 1922) c g
 Hemerobius pennii Monserrat, 1996 c g
 Hemerobius perelegans Stephens, 1836 c g
 Hemerobius phaleratus (Schneider, 1847) c g
 Hemerobius pini Stephens, 1836 c g
 Hemerobius pinidumus Fitch, 1855 i c g
 Hemerobius poppii Esben-Petersen, 1921 c g
 Hemerobius productus (Tjeder, 1961) c g
 Hemerobius prohumulinus Makarkin, 1991 c g
 Hemerobius punctatus Turton, 1802 c g
 Hemerobius radialis Nakahara, 1956 c g
 Hemerobius raphidioides Villers, 1789 c g
 Hemerobius reconditus Navás, 1914 c g
 Hemerobius ricarti Navás, 1925 c g
 Hemerobius rizali Banks, 1920 c g
 Hemerobius rudebecki Tjeder, 1961 c g
 Hemerobius rufescens Göszy, 1852 c g
 Hemerobius rufus Villers, 1789 c g
 Hemerobius schedli Hölzel, 1970 c g
 Hemerobius semblinus Schrank, 1802 c g
 Hemerobius shibakawae Nakahara, 1915 c g
 Hemerobius signatus Krüger, 1922 c
 Hemerobius simulans Walker, 1853 i c g
 Hemerobius solanensis Ghosh, 1976 c g
 Hemerobius solidarius Monserrat, 1996 c g
 Hemerobius spinellus Lichtenstein, 1796 c g
 Hemerobius spodipennis C.-k. Yang, 1987 c g
 Hemerobius stenopterus Monserrat, 1996 c g
 Hemerobius stigma Stephens, 1836 i c g b
 Hemerobius striatus Nakahara, 1915 c g
 Hemerobius subfalcatus Nakahara, 1960 c g
 Hemerobius subtriangulus C.-k. Yang, 1987 c g
 Hemerobius tagalicus Banks, 1920 c g
 Hemerobius tateyamai Nakahara, 1960 c g
 Hemerobius ternarius C.-k. Yang, 1987 c g
 Hemerobius tibialis Navás, 1917 i c g
 Hemerobius tolimensis Banks, 1910 i c g
 Hemerobius triangularis McLachlan in Fedchenko, 1875 c g
 Hemerobius trifasciatus Navás, 1932 c
 Hemerobius tristriatus Kuwayama, 1954 c g
 Hemerobius vagans Banks, 1937 c g
 Hemerobius varius Villers, 1789 c g
 Hemerobius versicolor Gmelin, 1790 c g
 Hemerobius vnipunctatus Müller, 1764 c g
 Hemerobius withycombei (Kimmins, 1928) i c g
 Hemerobius zernyi Esben-Petersen, 1935 c g

Data sources: i = ITIS, c = Catalogue of Life, g = GBIF, b = Bugguide.net

References

Hemerobius